Gareon Conley (born June 29, 1995) is a former American football cornerback. He played college football at Ohio State and was drafted by the Oakland Raiders in the first round of the 2017 NFL Draft.

Early years
Conley attended Massillon Washington High School in Massillon, Ohio, where he played high school football. On defense, he was a cornerback, and on offense, he was a wide receiver. As a senior, he had 25 tackles and an interception on defense and 50 receptions and 16 touchdowns on offense. Conley originally committed to the University of Michigan to play college football but later changed his choice to Ohio State University.

College career
After redshirting his first year at Ohio State in 2013, Conley played in all 15 games as a redshirt freshman in 2014, recording 16 tackles. He became a starter his sophomore year in 2015, starting all 13 games and finishing with 49 tackles and two interceptions. On November 29, 2016, Conley was named Second-team All-Big Ten by the Coaches and Third-team by the media. After the 2016 season, Conley decided to forgo his senior year and enter the 2017 NFL Draft.

Professional career

Pre-draft
Conley received an invitation to the NFL Combine and completed all the combine and positional drills. He also participated at Ohio State's Pro Day, but chose to only perform positional drills for representatives and scouts in attendance. NFL Draft experts and analysts projected Conley to be selected in the first round. He was ranked the second best cornerback, behind Ohio State teammate Marshon Lattimore, by NFLDraftScout.com, ESPN, and NFL analyst Mike Mayock. He was also ranked the fourth best cornerback by Sports Illustrated.

Just days prior to the 2017 NFL Draft, a woman accused Conley of rape, claiming it had occurred earlier in the month in a hotel room in Cleveland. Conley, in a statement, strongly denied the allegations. It was speculated he may fall out of the first round of the draft due to the sexual assault claims. A grand jury ruled not to charge Conley on July 31, 2017.

Oakland Raiders

2017
The Oakland Raiders selected Conley in the first round (24th overall) of the draft. The Raiders conducted their own investigation and administered a polygraph test to Conley. They chose to select him after he passed the polygraph test. On July 28, 2017, Conley signed a four-year deal worth $10.467 million featuring a $5.752 million signing bonus. He missed the season opener against the Titans due to a shin injury but returned in Weeks 2 and 3 before aggravating the shin injury. He was inactive for the next six games before eventually being placed on injured reserve on November 13, 2017.

2018
In Week 4 of the 2018 season, against the Cleveland Browns, Conley recorded a 36-yard pick-six off of Baker Mayfield for his first professional touchdown.
In week 11 against the Arizona Cardinals, Conley intercepted Josh Rosen's first pass of the game; the Raiders eventually won 23-21.
In week 15 against the Cincinnati Bengals, Conley suffered a concussion in the third quarter and was forced to miss the rest of the game as well as the following week's game against the Denver Broncos.
In the beginning of the season, Conley struggled in coverage and was a liability when tackling. He was eventually benched, but made vast improvements when he returned to the starting lineup.
During the second half of the season, Conley established himself as a shutdown cornerback. He held Tyreek Hill of the Kansas City Chiefs to 1 catch for 13 yards in week 13 and held Antonio Brown of the Pittsburgh Steelers to 5 catches for 35 yards the following week. Raiders head coach Jon Gruden stated that "He’s a lot more confident now," and former Raiders cornerback Lester Hayes said, “That boy can play.” 
Conley finished the season with 37 tackles, 15 passes defended, and 3 interceptions, including 1 pick six.
He received an overall grade of 64.0 from Pro Football Focus in 2018, which ranked as the 68th highest grade among all qualifying corner backs.

2019
In week 1 against the Denver Broncos, Conley made 4 tackles before suffering a neck injury when teammate Johnathan Abram's leg hit him on the top of his helmet.  Conley had to be taken off the field with a stretcher and as he was being carted off the field, he was able to give a thumbs up.  He was later hospitalized, but was released from the hospital the same day.
In week 5 against the Chicago Bears, Conley recorded an interception off Chase Daniel late in the fourth quarter which sealed a 24–21 win.

Houston Texans
On October 21, 2019, Conley was traded to the Houston Texans in exchange for a third round pick in the 2020 NFL Draft that was originally acquired from the Seattle Seahawks.
Conley made his debut with the Texans in week 8 against his former team, the Oakland Raiders.  In the game, Conley recorded 4 tackles as the Texans won 27–24.

In the Divisional Round of the playoffs against the Kansas City Chiefs, Conley recorded 5 tackles and sacked quarterback Patrick Mahomes once during the 51–31 loss.

On April 29, 2020, the Texans declined the option on Conley's contract, making him a free agent in 2021. He was placed on the active/physically unable to perform list at the start of training camp on July 31, 2020. He was activated on August 10, 2020. He was placed on injured reserve on September 7, 2020.

References

External links
 Houston Texans bio
 Ohio State Buckeyes bio

1995 births
Living people
American football cornerbacks
Houston Texans players
Oakland Raiders players
Ohio State Buckeyes football players
Players of American football from Ohio
Sportspeople from Massillon, Ohio